Gary Weeks (born June 4, 1972) is a German-born, American film and television actor; he is also a film producer and screenwriter.

Biography
Gary Weeks was born in Wiesbaden, Hessen, Federal Republic of Germany in a U.S. airbase. He was raised in Georgia, attended high school at Lakeside High School in Alabama, and he attended The University of Georgia and Georgia State University.

Weeks has appeared in over 50 television productions and more than 25 film productions.

He is best known as Luke Maybank in the Netflix series Outer Banks, Campbell in the television series Burn Notice and as Nick Newport Jr. in Parks and Recreation.

His recent feature films include Spider-Man: No Way Home (2021), Greenland (2020), Spider-Man: Homecoming (2017), Instant Family, Five Feet Apart (2019).

Weeks has also written/produced/directed films such as Deadland and Meth Head, as well as the festival darling 29 Reasons to Run.

Filmography

References

External links
 
 

1972 births
Living people
American male film actors
American film producers
American male screenwriters
American male television actors
People from Wiesbaden